Ski Dubai is an indoor ski resort with 22,500 square meters of indoor ski area. The park maintains a temperature of -1 degree to 2 degrees Celsius throughout the year. It is a part of the Mall of the Emirates, one of the largest shopping malls in the world, located in Dubai, United Arab Emirates. It was developed by Majid Al Futtaim Group, which also operates the Mall of the Emirates.

Opened in November 2005, the indoor resort features an 85-metre-high indoor mountain (equivalent to a 25-story building) with 5 slopes of varying steepness and difficulty, including a 400-metre-long run, the world's first indoor black diamond run, and various features (boxes, rails, kickers) that are changed on a regular basis. A chairlift and a tow lift carry skiers and snowboarders up the mountain. Equipment such as skis and jackets are provided with the ticket and one can buy equipment in the nearby stores.  Adjoining the slopes is a 3,000-square-metre Snow Park play area comprising sled and toboggan runs, an icy body slide, climbing towers, giant snowballs and an ice cave. Ski Dubai also houses a number of penguins who are let out of their enclosures several times a day. Penguin encounters can be booked, allowing the public to interact directly with the penguins.

In 2007 Ski Dubai was awarded the Thea Outstanding Achievement Award by the Themed Entertainment Association. Ski Dubai was designed by Acer Snowmec (part of the 360 Group and designers of the largest indoor ski centre in the world, Harbin Indoor Ski Centre). Acer Snowmec also provides the patented snow making technology to the centre. The Snow Play Area was designed and produced by Thinkwell Group.

See also
SnOasis
SSAWS
Tourist attractions in Dubai

References

External links

 Official website

 

Indoor ski resorts
Ski areas and resorts in the United Arab Emirates
Buildings and structures completed in 2005
Resorts in Dubai